Charles Chester Reid (June 15, 1868 – May 20, 1922) was an American lawyer and politician who served five terms as a U.S. Representative from Arkansas from 1901 to 1911.

Early life and career 
Born in Clarksville, Arkansas, Reid attended the public schools and the University of Arkansas at Fayetteville in 1883–1885.
He was graduated from the law department of Vanderbilt University, Nashville, Tennessee, in 1887.

He was admitted to the bar the same year and commenced practice in Morrilton, Arkansas.
He served as prosecuting attorney of Conway County from 1894 to 1898. In 1898 he voluntarily retired from office and resumed the practice of law.

Congress 
Reid was elected as a Democrat to the Fifty-seventh and to the four succeeding Congresses (March 4, 1901 – March 3, 1911).
He was not a candidate for renomination in 1910 to the Sixty-second Congress.

Later career and death 
He again engaged in the practice of his profession in Little Rock, Arkansas, where he died on May 20, 1922.

He was interred in Oakland Cemetery.

References

External links

1868 births
1922 deaths
Democratic Party members of the United States House of Representatives from Arkansas
Vanderbilt University Law School alumni
University of Arkansas alumni
People from Clarksville, Arkansas
Politicians from Little Rock, Arkansas